France competed at the 2004 Summer Olympics in Athens, Greece, from 13 to 29 August 2004. French athletes have competed in every Summer Olympic Games of the modern era. The French Olympic Committee sent a total of 308 athletes to the Games, 195 men and 113 women, to compete in 25 sports.

Medalists

| width="78%" align="left" valign="top" |

| width="22%" align="left" valign="top" |

Archery 

France has qualified three archers each in the men's and women's team.

Men

Women

Athletics 

French athletes have so far achieved qualifying standards in the following athletics events (up to a maximum of 3 athletes in each event at the 'A' Standard, and 1 at the 'B' Standard).

Men
Track & road events

Field events

Combined events – Decathlon

Women
Track & road events

Field events

Combined events – Heptathlon

Badminton

Boxing

France sent six boxers to Athens, mostly in the lighter weight classes.  They won a silver medal.  Two lost their first bouts, as the team combined for a record of 8–6.  France was part of a four-way tie for 8th place in the boxing medals scoreboard.

Canoeing

Slalom

Sprint

Qualification Legend: Q = Qualify to final; q = Qualify to semifinal

Cycling

Road
Men

Women

Track
Sprint

Pursuit

Time trial

Keirin

Omnium

Mountain biking

Diving 

France has qualified a single diver.

Women

Equestrian

France has qualified two riders in dressage, and a spot for the team each in eventing and show jumping. The team of Arnaud Boiteau, Didier Courrèges, Cédric Lyard, Jean Teulère and Nicolas Touzaint captured the gold medal in team eventing after winning an appeal against an earlier decision imposed by the FEI Ground Jury, that gave German rider Bettina Hoy and her team a triumphant gold medal double.

Dressage

Eventing

"#" indicates that the score of this rider does not count in the team competition, since only the best three results of a team are counted.

Show jumping

Fencing

Men

Women

Gymnastics

Artistic
Men
Team

Individual finals

Women
Team

Individual finals

Trampoline

Handball

Men's tournament

Roster

Group play

Quarterfinal

5th-8th Classification

Fifth Place Final

Women's tournament

Roster

Group play

Quarterfinal

Semifinal

Bronze Medal Final

Judo

France has qualified thirteen judoka.

Men

Women

Modern pentathlon

France has qualified four athletes in modern pentathlon

Rowing

Men

Women

Qualification Legend: FA=Final A (medal); FB=Final B (non-medal); FC=Final C (non-medal); FD=Final D (non-medal); FE=Final E (non-medal); FF=Final F (non-medal); SA/B=Semifinals A/B; SC/D=Semifinals C/D; SE/F=Semifinals E/F; R=Repechage

Sailing

Men

Women

Open

M = Medal race; OCS = On course side of the starting line; DSQ = Disqualified; DNF = Did not finish; DNS= Did not start; RDG = Redress given

Shooting 

Men

Women

Swimming 

French swimmers earned qualifying standards in the following events (up to a maximum of 2 swimmers in each event at the A-standard time, and 1 at the B-standard time):

Men

* Competed only in heats

Women

Synchronized swimming

Table tennis

Taekwondo

Tennis

Men

Women

Triathlon

While the French had fewer top eight triathletes in 2004 than they had in 2000, Frédéric Belaubre earned the highest individual place of any French triathlete with a fifth-place finish.  France's sole female triathlete was the last to finish.

Volleyball

Beach

Indoor

Men's tournament

Roster

Group play

Weightlifting

Wrestling 

Men's freestyle

Men's Greco-Roman

Women's freestyle

See also
 France at the 2004 Summer Paralympics
 France at the 2005 Mediterranean Games

References

External links
Official Report of the XXVIII Olympiad
French Olympic Committee 

Nations at the 2004 Summer Olympics
2004 Summer
Summer Olympics